Rohr may refer to:

Places

Austria
Rohr bei Hartberg, in Styria
Rohr im Burgenland, in Burgenland
Rohr im Gebirge, in Lower Austria
Rohr im Kremstal, in Upper Austria

Canada
Mount Rohr, in the Coast Mountains, BC

France
Rohr, Bas-Rhin, in the Bas-Rhin département

Germany
Rohr, Thuringia, in the Schmalkalden-Meiningen district, Thuringia
Rohr, Middle Franconia, in the Roth district, Bavaria
Rohr in Niederbayern, in the Kelheim district, Bavaria
A part of Plattling in the Deggendorf district, Bavaria
A part of Waltenhofen in the Oberallgäu district, Bavaria
A part of Blankenheim in the Euskirchen district, North Rhine-Westphalia
A part of Freystadt in the Neumarkt in der Oberpfalz district, Bavaria
A part of Rohrbach in the Pfaffenhofen an der Ilm district, Bavaria
A part of Eurasburg in the Bad Tölz-Wolfratshausen district, Bavaria
A part of Neudrossenfeld in the Kulmbach district, Bavaria
A part of Weilheim in the Waldshut district, Baden-Württemberg
A part of Günzach in the Ostallgäu, Bavaria
A part of Vaihingen (Stuttgart), in Stuttgart, Baden-Württemberg

Switzerland
Rohr, Aargau, in the Canton of Aargau
Rohr, Solothurn, in the Canton of Solothurn

United States
Rohr, West Virginia

Other uses
Rohr (surname)
Rohr, Inc. (formerly Rohr Industries)
British Standard Pipe threads where Rohr (German for pipe) indicates a tapered thread.

See also
Röhr (disambiguation)
Von Rohr